Butterly is the name of:

Caoimhe Butterly (born 1978), Irish human rights activist
Daniel Butterly (born 1970), American sports administrator
Kathy Butterly (born 1963), American sculptor
Michelle Butterly (born 1970), English actress
Butterly (1787 cricketer), English first-class cricketer

See also
Butterley, a village in Derbyshire, England